Dalila Abdulkadir Gosa (born June 27, 1998) is a Bahraini long-distance runner. She was scheduled to compete at the 2016 Summer Olympics in the women's 5000 metres race but did not start the race.

References

1998 births
Living people
Bahraini female long-distance runners
Olympic athletes of Bahrain
Athletes (track and field) at the 2016 Summer Olympics
21st-century Bahraini women